UFC Fight Night: Gonzaga vs. Cro Cop 2 (also known as UFC Fight Night 64) was a mixed martial arts event held on April 11, 2015, at the Tauron Arena Kraków in Kraków, Poland.

Background
The event was the first that the organization has hosted in Poland.

The main event featured a heavyweight rematch between Gabriel Gonzaga and returning veteran Mirko Cro Cop, who last fought in the organization at UFC 137 in 2011. Gonzaga won their first encounter at UFC 70 in 2007 via knockout due to a first round head kick which has become one of the most famous and replayed finishes in UFC history.

Peter Sobotta was expected to face Sérgio Moraes at the event. However, Sobotta was forced out of the bout citing injury and was replaced by Gasan Umalatov. On March 28, it was announced that Umalatov had also pulled out of the fight and was replaced by French newcomer Mickaël Lebout.

Krzysztof Jotko was expected to face promotional newcomer Garreth McLellan at the event. However, Jotko pulled out of the bout and was replaced by fellow newcomer Bartosz Fabiński.

Cláudia Gadelha was expected to face Aisling Daly at the event. However, Gadelha pulled out of the bout in late March citing a recent muscle spasm in her back. Subsequently, Daly was pulled from the card entirely.

Jason Saggo was expected to face Marcin Bandel at the event. However, Saggo pulled out of the bout due to an Achilles tendon rupture and was replaced by promotional newcomer Stevie Ray.

Results

Bonus awards
The following fighters were awarded $50,000 bonuses:

Fight of the Night: Mirko Cro Cop vs. Gabriel Gonzaga
Performance of the Night: Maryna Moroz and Leon Edwards

See also
List of UFC events
2015 in UFC

References

UFC Fight Night
2015 in mixed martial arts
Mixed martial arts in Poland
Sports competitions in Kraków
April 2015 sports events in Europe
21st century in Kraków